Abramo is a village and rural locality (municipality) in La Pampa Province in Argentina.

The village is reachable via Ruta Provincial 3, which is a connection to Ruta Nacional 35.

Population 
Abramo has a population of 323 inhabitants according to the 2001 INDEC census, which represents a slight increase of 0.6% over the previous 321 inhabitants that were recorded in the 1991 INDEC census.

References

Populated places in La Pampa Province